Club Deportivo Sariñena is a Spanish football team based in Sariñena, in the autonomous community of Aragon. Founded in 1945 it plays in Tercera División - Group 17, holding home games at Estadio El Carmen, with a 4,500-seat capacity.

Season to season
 As C. D. Sariñena E. y D.

 As C. F. Sariñena

 As C. F. Nivelcampo

 As C. F. Sariñena

 As C. D. Sariñena

1 seasons in Segunda División B
34 seasons in Tercera División

Honours
Tercera División: 2012–13

References

External links
Futbolme team profile 
Fútbol Aragon team profile 

Football clubs in Aragon
Association football clubs established in 1945
1945 establishments in Spain